Makha is an important town lying on the bank of Teesta River in  Gangtok district of Sikkim, India. Makha lies between Singtam and Dikchu.

Transport 
The town is well connected to many parts of Sikkim and its neighbouring state West Bengal. Taxi services access Gangtok, Mangan, Chungthang, Singtam, Rangpo, Dikchu, Ranipool, Lachen, Lachung  and Siliguri.

The nearest airport is Pakyong Airport 45 kilometres away.
The nearest railway stations are:
 Sevoke Junction 90 kilometres.
 Siliguri Junction 103 kilometres.
 New Jalpaiguri  115 kilometres.

Rangpo railway station is an under construction station 35 kilometres away from the town.

References

Cities and towns in Gangtok district